Cornus peruviana is a species of tree in the family Cornaceae native to montane forests of southern Central America and western South America, from Costa Rica and Venezuela south to Bolivia.

Description
Cornus peruviana is a small to a large tree up to 20 meters tall, and flowering at 3 meters high. Trees flower and fruit year round.

Range and habitat
Cornus peruviana is native to the Cordillera de Talamanca of Costa Rica (Puntarenas and San Jose provinces), and the northern Andes of Colombia (Antioquia, Cundinamarca, and  Nariño departments), Venezuela (Táchira state), Ecuador (Pichincha Province), Peru (Amazonas, Apurímac, and San Martín departments), and Bolivia (Ayopaya Province).

Its typical habitats are forested slopes and stream banks in montane forests between 1,800 and 3,400 meters elevation.

References 

peruviana
Trees of Venezuela
Trees of Peru
Trees of Ecuador
Trees of Bolivia
Trees of Colombia
Flora of the Andes